Treffynnon (Welsh: tref - town + ffynnon - spring, well) is a hamlet of about twenty houses located between St Davids and Fishguard, about a mile inland from the A487 at Croesgoch in Pembrokeshire.

On the edge of the village stands Treffynnon Chapel, a Welsh Calvinistic Methodist foundation, originally built in 1867 and rebuilt in 1876. Treffynnon has only one named road with the unusual address of Council Houses, a row of six local authority dwellings dating from the 1960s known locally as The Street.

References 

Villages in Pembrokeshire